Microcastle is the third album by Deerhunter. After the album had been leaked on the internet, it became available on iTunes on August 19, 2008, while physical copies were released on October 27, 2008. In the U.S. the album was released on Kranky and on 4AD in Europe. The album was recorded over the course of one week in April 2008 by Nicolas Vernhes at Rare Book Room Studios in Brooklyn, NY. In the U.S., the album has managed to sell over 50,000 units.

Unlike Cryptograms, the band decided to forgo heavy utilization of effects pedals. Throughout the recording of the record, only a number of drum tracks and the vocals on "Agoraphobia" were treated. Of the musical direction of the new material, Bradford Cox has said "I'm more interested in the micro-structure. I want things to be a lot shorter, I don't want there to be as much long-windedness to it." The band premiered the album live at Brooklyn's Market Hotel on April 11, 2008. A bonus disc, Weird Era Cont., was released concurrently with the album.

"Saved By Old Times" features an appearance by Cole Alexander of the Black Lips. His appearance was recorded over an iChat session.

Vinyl versions
The original pressing of the vinyl on Kranky was one white vinyl LP, had a single panel jacket with different artwork than the CD (see alternate artwork), and came with Weird Era Cont. on CD in its own paper sleeve. Since the album has gained popularity, there has been another pressing, with both parts of the album being pressed on black vinyl in a gatefold jacket with the orange artwork originally used for the CD.

Reception

Microcastle has been met with much acclaim since its release, currently holding an 81 rating on Metacritic, from a weighted average of 35 professional critics, indicating "Universal Acclaim". Both Tiny Mix Tapes and Sputnikmusic awarded the album with a perfect score. Spin, Billboard, The New York Times and The Guardian all gave the album an 8/10. Rolling Stone rewarded the album a 3.5 score, and RS contributor, Daniel Kreps listed Microcastle/Weird Era Cont. as his favorite album of 2008. Pitchfork also rated the album highly, naming the album 50th best record of the decade and 5th best of the year, along with awarding it with a 9.2 upon initial review. Pitchfork also named “Nothing Ever Happened” the 6th best song of the year and 81st best song of the decade. Hype Machine rated the album as 11th best of the year.

Track listing

 Tracks 6–8 are part of a suite

Personnel
Deerhunter
Moses Archuleta – drums
Bradford J. Cox – guitar, keyboards, vocals
Joshua Fauver – bass
Lockett Pundt – guitar, vocals on "Agoraphobia" & "Neither of Us, Uncertainly"

Additional musicians
Cole Alexander – vocal montage on "Saved By Old Times"
Nicolas Vernhes - SK-1 on "Agoraphobia"

Technical staff
Joe Lambert – mastering
Nicolas Vernhes – producer, engineer

Chart positions

References

External links
 Video of the group discussing and recording the album

2008 albums
Deerhunter albums
Kranky albums
4AD albums
Shoegaze albums by American artists
Indie pop albums by American artists
Baroque pop albums